Richard Henry "Honey" Starzyk (March 1, 1921 – October 6, 1990) was an American professional basketball player. He played for the Tri-Cities Blackhawks in the National Basketball League during the 1946–47 season and averaged 1.3 points per game. Starzyk also played for the Grand Rapids Rangers in the Professional Basketball League of America.

References

1921 births
1990 deaths
American men's basketball players
American military personnel of World War II
Basketball players from Chicago
DePaul Blue Demons men's basketball players
Guards (basketball)
Professional Basketball League of America players
Tri-Cities Blackhawks players